Cold Spring (sometimes spelled Cold Springs) is an unincorporated community in Bledsoe County, Tennessee, United States. It lies along U.S. Route 127 northeast of the city of Pikeville, the county seat of Bledsoe County.

References

Unincorporated communities in Bledsoe County, Tennessee
Unincorporated communities in Tennessee